was a railway station on the Hakodate Main Line in Nanae, Hokkaido, Japan, operated by the Hokkaido Railway Company (JR Hokkaido). The station closed on March 12, 2022.

Lines
Nagareyama Onsen Station is served by the Hakodate Main Line Sawara branch, and is numbered N70.

History
The station opened in April 2002.

References

Railway stations in Hokkaido Prefecture
Railway stations in Japan opened in 2002
Railway stations closed in 2022